The 2023 Vuelta a Murcia was the 43rd edition of the Vuelta a Murcia road cycling race. It was held on 11 February 2023 in the titular region of southeastern Spain as a category 1.1 event on the 2023 UCI Europe Tour calendar.

Teams 
Twelve UCI WorldTeams, eight UCI ProTeams, and one UCI Continental teams made up the twenty-one teams that participated in the race. Of the 146 riders to start the race, 107 finished.

UCI WorldTeams

 
 
 
 
 
 
 
 
 
 
 
 

UCI ProTeams

 
 
 
 
 
 
 
 

UCI Continental Teams

Results

References 

2023
Vuelta a Murcia
Vuelta a Murcia
Vuelta a Murcia